Theuderic III (or Theuderich, Theoderic, or Theodoric) (c. 651–691) was the king of Neustria (including Burgundy) on two occasions (673 and 675–691) and king of Austrasia from 679 to his death in 691. Thus, he was the king of all the Franks from 679. The son of Clovis II and Balthild, he has been described as a puppet – a roi fainéant – of Ebroin, the Mayor of the Palace, who may have even appointed him without the support of the nobles.

He succeeded his brother Chlothar III in Neustria in 673, but Childeric II of Austrasia displaced him soon thereafter until he died in 675 and Theuderic retook his throne. He fought a war against Dagobert II. His forces under Ebroin were victorious at the Battle of Lucofao. When Dagobert died in 679, Theuderic became king of Austrasia as well, unifying the Frankish realms.

He and the Neustrian mayor of the palace, Waratton, made peace with Pepin of Heristal, mayor of the palace of Austrasia, in 681. However, on Waratton's death in 686, the new mayor, Berchar, made war with Austrasia and Pepin vanquished the Burgundo-Neustrian army under Berchar and Theuderic (a Neustrian) at the Battle of Tertry in 687, thus paving the way for Austrasian dominance of the Frankish state.

Marriage and issue
He married Clotilda, a daughter of Ansegisel and Saint Begga of Landen.

They had the following children:

 Clovis IV, king (677-694)
 Childebert III, king (678/79–711)

He married Amalberge (Saint Amalaberga) before 674, daughter of Wandregisis and Farahild.

He was possibly father of:

 Clovis III, king of Austrasia (ruled 675–676)

References

Bibliography

|-

Merovingian kings
Rois fainéants
7th-century Frankish kings

651 births
691 deaths

Year of birth uncertain